The Samsung Galaxy J7 (2016) is an Android-based mid-range smartphone produced by Samsung Electronics in 2016 and is either based on the Qualcomm Snapdragon 615 or Exynos 7870 chipset.

Hardware

The Samsung Galaxy J7 comes with a removable back panel, metallic chrome diamond-designed frame and a metal-finish plastic back cover. On the front of the phone, there is a 5.5 inch screen with two capacitive buttons to switch between apps and a hardware home button just below the screen. Above the display, there is a 5-megapixel camera with an LED flash and a chrome grill covering the earpiece and sensors. It has a Samsung S5K3L2 CMOS image sensor.
On the right edge of the phone, there is a power button and there are volume keys on the left edge of the phone. There is a 3.5mm headphone jack and a micro-USB port at the bottom of the device. On the backside of the device, there is a slot for a microSD card and 2 slots for SIM cards and NFC chips with a 3300mAh battery concealed under a plastic rear cover.

Samsung Galaxy J7 has a HD Super AMOLED display with a resolution of 720×1280. The screen comes with scratch resistant glass, which according to Samsung is equivalent to Corning's Gorilla Glass 3.

Software

The Samsung Galaxy J7 (2016) comes with Android 6.0.1 Marshmallow and Samsung's TouchWiz user interface.

The phone then got an update to Android 7.0 Nougat with Samsung Experience 8.1.

In November 2018, the J7 (2016) got an update to Android 8.1.0 Oreo  with Samsung Experience 9.5.

References

Samsung mobile phones
Samsung Galaxy
Mobile phones introduced in 2016
Discontinued smartphones
Mobile phones with user-replaceable battery